Beaver Scouts, often shortened to Beavers, is the second youngest official section of Scouting operated by The Scout Association in the United Kingdom. The core age range for Beaver Scouts is six to eight years. Sections of Beaver Scouts are known as Colonies and are run locally by Scout Groups. After reaching the age of eight, a Beaver Scout will then move on to Cub Scouts. The section officially launched in 1986 but had existed before this as trial and unofficial sections as far back as 1963.

Beaver Scouts share many of the features of older Scouting sections such as badges for skills learned and challenges and a uniform consisting of a light blue sweatshirt. They take a simplified version of the Scout promise. Beavers Scouts are open to boys and girls, a change introduced in 1991, and are open to those of different faiths, or none.

History

Early ideas: 1960s

Since the creation of the Scouting movement in 1907, there was demand from the younger brothers of Scouts who wanted to join in with their older siblings. This demand would lead to the creation of Wolf Cubs in 1916 for boys 8 years of age and up but there was still pressure from the younger brothers to become involved.

The first pre-Cub scheme was set up in Northern Ireland by the 1st Dromore Group in 1963 and was called The Little Brothers, spreading to Belfast with seven groups two years later. The creation of an under eight provision was sparked by the launch of other younger sections in other youth organisations at the time, including the Anchors section of the Boys' Brigade, which some feared was partly causing a drop in numbers of Cubs experienced at the time. As the scheme expanded throughout the rest of the province, it was given the official name of Beavers in 1966, which had been a name considered by Robert Baden-Powell when creating Wolf Cubs.

That year The Chief Scout's Advance Party Report was published, which brought to a close a period of reflection undertaken since January 1964 and led to significant structural changes within the organisation, with the question of a pre-Cubs section having been looked into. The report came to the conclusion that any lowering of the age for the newly renamed Cub Scouts below 8 years old would result in difficulties in retaining the older Cub Scouts and that allowing boys under 8 should not be allowed, to maintain a uniform approach. Any provision for boys under 8 must therefore be developed as their own section, which was not recommended as being followed at that time. It did however recommend that any developments in this area be monitored by national Cub Scout leadership.

Trials: 1970s
Despite the report's recommendations other under eight provisions were trialled and investigated in a number of different locations internationally and unofficially in the United Kingdom. By 1975 there existed in England an 'Adventurers' section in Dulwich and West Peckham in South London, 'Mini-Cubs' in Lancashire, 'Tweenies' in Southwark and 'Pre-Scout training' in Brighton. There were also a number of sections in Scotland including Acorns (A Cub OR Nearly So) in Coatbridge, Mini-Cubs and Tenderpads in Dundee and over a dozen groups in Glasgow of varying names including Panthers, Beavers, Chimps, Sparks and Mini-Cubs, with an advisory body. All of these organisations differed wildly in programme, uniform, structure and whether they had a law and promise.

By 1975 however, Beavers in Northern Ireland had advanced significantly to include approximately 100 Beaver groups, 2,500 boy members and 200 leaders; this compared to around 4,500 Cub Scouts in 520 packs at the same time. In September 1968, the Beavers Association was set up to oversee development of the section and they published a Beavers Handbook and organised an annual conference for leaders. It was noticed that a number of adults had stepped forward to help run the section who had no previous connection to youth work, which allayed fears over the growth of the new section by some. A common uniform of a grey shirt and emerald green necker was introduced, as was a programme that did not use any of the Cub Scout content at all, instead linked to four pawprint badges and the name Beavers as a backronym: Building, Energy release, Adventure, Variety, Entertaining, Religion and Storytelling. In 1973, a resolution was published requesting Beavers be formally adopted into the structure of Scouting in Northern Ireland, and in early 1975 this was approved.

In 1974, the youth scene had developed enough that a new review and report were commissioned to look into the matter of a Pre-Cub section. The Wellbeloved Report, which was published in 1975, recommended the development of an under eight section as a priority. It determined a section could be delivered in line with the aims of the movement and would not cause significant reputational or organisational problems for the other older sections.

Launch and growth: 1982-2002

In October 1982 Beavers were introduced throughout the rest of the United Kingdom with a uniform of a grey jumper, turquoise necker, maroon woggle and optional grey tracksuit bottoms. The section officially became part of The Scout Association and the World Scout Organisation on 1 April 1986 with the introduction of a simplified promise for the section. The initial award for the section was a singular Beaver Scout Award, awarded for at least nine months of participation in a varied programme, at least one visit and at least one good turn. By the time Beavers was officially launched, there were 60,000 Beaver Scouts in the UK.

A small change to the uniform came in 1990 when Beaver Scouts were able to wear their group necker instead of a turquoise one. A larger change came in 1991 when girls were allowed into the section for the first time. This change was confirmed in 2007 when all Beaver Scout sections were made coeducational (with some exceptions). As of January 2020, the number of Beaver Scouts in the UK was 127,030, of whom 100,997 were recorded as male and 25,633 were recorded as female, meaning at present 20.1% of the section are female.

A small re-launch to the section came in 1995 when the Beaver Scout Badge was removed and replaced by two separate badges. The rationale for this replacement was that a year was a long time for a Beaver Scout to wait for a reward for taking part, so this was split into two awards, each awarded for 6–8 months' participation in a varied programme. The Scout Association also launched an optional Beaver Scout Challenge, awarded for completing four challenges that matched the programme areas: a personal challenge, a scouting challenge, an exploring challenge and a caring activity. The uniform was also modified to allow for different coloured woggles with a scarf as a 'lodge' system of grouping young people had become popular and many wished to display this through coloured woggles.

In 1997 the ability to hold sleepovers, limited to one night, with the Beaver Scout section was added to the programme as an option with the aim of giving Beavers a taster of the longer residential experiences offered in Cub Scouts and Scouts as well as a way of developing independence skills.

Re-launch: 2002-2015

In 2002 the Beaver Scout programme, badges and uniform were completely overhauled. The uniform was now a light blue sweatshirt and there was a much bigger range of badges for the Beaver Scouts to earn, aligning the programme with the other sections. A logo was introduced along with all publications for the section being relaunched to reflect the new programme and wider Scout Association brand and visual identity.

The First and Second Beaver Scout awards were discontinued, and two Joining In Awards were introduced to recognise a year's participation in the new programme, now divided into five programme zones. While participation was now marked through the Joining In Awards, new Challenge awards and a top award for the section were introduced to mark achievement. Initially there were three (the Outdoor Challenge, the Discovery Challenge and the Friendship Challenge), each requiring the Beaver Scout to complete six activities from areas that linked to the wider programme objectives and zones. The top award for the section, the Chief Scout's Bronze Award, was achieved for completion of the Outdoor challenge, one of the other challenges and a personal challenge.

In addition, Activity Badges were introduced to the section for the first time, mirroring the ability to be rewarded for progression in a skill that had existed in older sections for decades. Initially five were launched: Animal Friend, Creative, Experiment, Explore and Faith. In October 2006 the five badges were updated and seven new badges were added to give greater choice and to provide coverage into more areas of the programme: Adventure, Air Activities, Health & Fitness, Healthy Eating, Hobbies, Imagination and Safety.

Beaver Scouts also benefited from the introduction of Staged Activity Badges and the Group Awards (later renamed Partnership Awards) in 2002 which were available to all sections under 18 years. The Group Awards were a series of three (International friendship, Environment and Faith) that encouraged multiple sections within a group to work together or to work with outside organisations to complete a project or activity. The Staged Activity Badges mirrored the new activity badges in each section but consisted of stages (five initially) that members could achieve at any age and often included skills that were developed over time. Upon their launch there were four focusing on Information Technology, Musician, Swimming and Nights Away (with the five stages recognising one, five, 10, 20 and 50 cumulative nights away from home respectively) before gaining badges in Emergency Aid and Hikes Away in October 2006 (with the Nights and Hikes away changing from five stages to more frequent stages numbered to directly reflect the number required).

In 2008, the Scout Association re-launched the programme zones so that there were now six zones with common themes for all four under 18 sections. As part of this, the Challenge Awards for the section were entirely re-written and replaced with six Challenge Awards that aligned with the six new zones: Promise, Friendship, Fitness, Creative, Global and Outdoor challenges. The Chief Scout's Bronze Award was also altered to make achievement of the award as simple as achieving all six Challenge Awards.

Being much younger than the other sections, the Beaver Scout section celebrates anniversaries more often than some of the other sections (often every five years). The 20th anniversary, celebrated in 2006, was marked with a special birthday edition of the Fundays event, as the Cub Scouts also celebrated their 90th anniversary that year and the 100th anniversary of Scouting was the following year. The 25th anniversary was celebrated in 2011 with various events around the country and a book published for the event.

In 2014, the Scouting for All strategic plan for the next four years was launched, which included an increased focus of community impact, youth voice and inclusion in the programme and which emerged from youth feedback. Off the back of this, a refresh of the programme was scheduled for 2015 and in April 2014, the Scout Association released nine new activity badges and one new staged activity badge which were to be added as part of the refresh. These nine new badges looked at Camp Craft, Collector, Communicator, Cyclist, Disability Awareness, Gardener, Photographer, Space and Sports with a new staged activity badge that captured the number of water activities completed (Time on the Water).

Skills for life refresh: 2015-present

In January 2015, the Beaver Scout programme received a refresh along with the programmes of all other sections and saw a renewed emphasis on outdoor activities, skills and world activities and the dropping of programme zones and partnership awards. Subsequently, the six Challenge Awards were replaced with six new hexagonal Challenge Awards: My Adventure, My Outdoors, My Skills, My World, Teamwork and Personal Challenges.

The number of Activity badges for the section had already been bolstered by the new additions in 2014 but changes were made to the remaining badges. The Adventure badge was discontinued and replaced with the My Adventure Challenge, the Air Activities badge was replaced by a new Air Activities staged activity badge, the Healthy Eating badge was re-launched as a Cook badge, the Health and Fitness and Imagination badges were discontinued and two new badges for Global Issues and International were launched. The number of Staged activity badges was also expanded greatly: the Information Technology badge was discontinued and replaced by a Digital Citizen (using technology) and Digital Maker (coding and uses of technology) badge; a new Air Activities staged badge for aeronautical skills and to link in with Air Scouts was launched; new Nautical skills, Paddle sports and Sailing staged badges to link with water activities and Sea Scouts were launched; a Navigator staged badge was launched to develop map-reading and navigating skills and a Community Impact staged activity badge was launched linking into the Scout's focus on community action and the A Million Hands partnership with charities.

In 2016, the Beaver Scouts celebrated their 30th anniversary with a badge and local events, but national recognition was more muted celebration as the centenary of the Cub Scouts that year received the focus of attention. That same year the Health and Fitness activity badge was reintroduced and the following year new resources and leader stripes were introduced to recognise Beavers who were made Lodge Leaders or Peer Leaders. In January 2018 the latest activity badges were added for Book Reader, mirroring some of the requirements of the Summer Reading Challenge run by libraries each year, and Builder, which involved using construction toys such as Lego.

In May 2018 the Scouts published their Skills for Life plan to 2023 which included improved tools for leaders, a refresh in the wider Scout visual identity and a promise to review uniforms. A part of this plan was a commitment to investigate an Early Years provision for Scouts, a section for four and five year olds that would feed into Beaver Scouts. A series of 29 pilot sections were established during 2018 and 2019, informally called Hedgehogs, trialling three different ways of running (family-run, Scout run and partnership-run). The trials were considered a success and the Scouts approved for them to continue and be expanded in August 2020.

Organisation

The Beaver Scout section is run locally by Scout groups, along with the Cub Scout and Scout sections, by a leader team led by a Beaver Scout Leader (often abbreviated to BSL). The leadership team is often supplemented by a number of other volunteers ranging from Assistant Beaver Scout Leaders, who share the same level of training as BSLs; Sectional Assistants, regular helpers supported by basic training; Young Leaders, 14-18 year olds who volunteer in the section; and occasional helpers who may be parents assisting as part of a rota. Often meeting weekly, a Beaver Scout group is referred to as a colony with usually no more than 24 young people. A Beaver Scout colony may divide the Beavers in it into smaller peer groups, the most common name for which is 'lodges' but use of this is not universal across the section.

The core age range for Beaver Scouts is between six and eight years although members can join up to three months before their sixth birthday or leave for Cub Scouts up to six months after their eighth birthday. These age ranges can be flexed further if required for inclusion requirements.

The activities undertaken by Beaver Scouts are collectively called the 'programme' and include activities, games, visits and residential experiences. The badges and awards achieved by the young people help support this programme and were initially divided into themed areas. Between 1995 and 2002, the programme was divided into four areas: learning about themselves, getting to know people, exploring and caring. With the re-launch of every section's programme in 2002, the four areas were tweaked into five programme zones: getting to know other people, learning about yourself, exploring the world around us, discovering creativity and practical skills and discovering beliefs and attitudes. Creativity had always been a part of the programme before being made a separate zone, but previously it had been used as a way of exploring the other areas. In 2008 the zones were updated again into six zones with themes common to all under-18 sections in Scouting: beliefs & attitudes, community, fitness, creative, global and outdoor & adventure. In 2015, the concept of zones was dropped across the movement with the focus now being on three core areas of outdoor & adventure, world and skills with outdoor & adventure making up half of time spent on the programme.

Membership
Beaver Scouts is, as of 2020, currently the third biggest section run by the Scout Association, behind Cub Scouts and Scouts respectively. From the mid-2000s until 2018 the number of Beaver Scouts had been steadily increasing, and from the same point to date the number of Beaver Scout colonies has increased every year. There was a slight decrease in numbers between 2018 and 2020 which matches a similar decline in the overall birthrate; 2012 was the high point for births in the UK with these children reaching Beaver Scout age in 2018. The COVID-19 pandemic caused a significant decline between 2020 and 2021 as scouting activities were suspended.

Promise
In common with other sections in Scouting, Beaver Scouts make a promise when they start in the section, normally in a ceremony in front of family members. The Beaver Scout promise is a simpler version of the Scout promise and makes no reference to a Scout law. The promise originally devised for the section, and the promise still used for Christians, Jews and Sikhs is:

I promise to do my best,
To be kind and helpful,
and to love God.

Muslims use a wording of the promise similar to that above but with the word 'God' replaced with 'Allah', while Buddhists and Hindus replace the word 'God' with 'my Dharma'. A promise for those of no faith was introduced in January 2014 and substitutes the word 'God' in the promise above for 'our world'.

Motto
Since 2002, the Beaver Scout section shares the general Scout motto of Be Prepared. Prior to 2002, the motto was Fun and Friends, which is reflected in the usual programme for the section, which made use of play to put across Scouting ideas of friendship and community.

Awards and badges
Beaver Scouts can gain a number of awards and badges covering the range of the programme. A number are core badges that are often earned by members as part of their time in the section. The Membership Award is given to Beavers after they have made their promise and been invested into the Movement, the Joining In Award recognises participation in the programme in yearly chunks and the Moving-On Award is given once a Beaver Scout has completed their time in Beavers and moved into Cub Scouts.

Activity Badges
As of September 2020, Beaver Scouts can earn 22 activity badges covering a range of skills and pursuits which can be earned as part of colony programme activities or at home in their own time. The current badges are: Animal Friend, Book Reader, Builder, Camp Craft, Collector, Communicator, Cook, Creative, Cyclist, Disability Awareness, Experiment, Explore, Faith, Gardener, Global Issues, Health and Fitness, Hobbies, International, Photographer, Safety, Space and Sports.

The requirements have been updated and changed over time and a few badges have been discontinued. In 2015 as part of a re-fresh, the Adventure, Air Activities and Healthy Eating activity badges were all replaced (with the My Adventure Challenge award, Air Activities Staged Activity badge and Cook activity badge respectively) and the Imagination and Health & Fitness badges were discontinued with the requirements being covered in the My Skills challenge. The Health and Fitness badge was later re-introduced with different requirements in 2016. They are circular yellow badges with a navy blue border, a design maintained since 2002.

Staged Activity Badges
Staged Activity Badges can be completed by any member of the movement between the age of 6 and 18. They are completed in different stages, so after completing each stage members are awarded the relevant badge and can advance to the next level while still in a younger section. Current Staged Activity badges that are available are Air Activities, Community Impact, Digital Citizen, Digital Maker, Emergency Aid, Hikes Away, Musician, Nautical Skills, Navigator, Nights Away, Paddle Sports, Sailing, Snowsports, Swimmer and Time on the Water. The number of stages in each badge varies but most have around five stages. The Nights Away, Hikes Away and Time on the Water stages have more, and count the number of cumulative experiences in that area the young people have, with sixteen milestones for Nights Away ranging from 1 to 200 nights away from home and eight for Hikes away and Time on the Water. The badge's design is a circular blue badges with a purple border, a design adopted in 2002 and with a slight darkening of the blue colour from 2018.

Challenge and Top Awards
Challenge Awards are often completed as a Colony as part of their normal activities rather than individually, and cover the range and aims of the programme. The six red hexagonal badges, worn on the chest, are entitled My Adventure, My Outdoor, My Skills, My World, Teamwork challenge and Personal challenge. They were introduced in January 2015 and replaced six previous yellow diamond-shaped awards that reflected the programme zones used prior to 2015.

The top award for the section that Beaver Scouts aim to achieve is the Chief Scout's Bronze Award. In order to attain it, Beaver Scouts must have completed the six Challenge Awards and four other activity badges by the time they join Cub Scouts or shortly after moving to the section.

Visual identity

Uniform

As part of the wider uniformed Scout movement, Beaver Scouts have a uniform consisting of a sky blue jumper and neckerchief for the group. A branded baseball cap, navy blue activity trousers and sky blue polo shirt can also form part of the uniform as well as other informal clothing such as hoodies as the situation requires it. It was designed by fashion designer Meg Andrew in 2000 as being a stylish and affordable uniform that was suited to outdoor wear and activity use. The uniform is used by any Beaver Scout, with those who are part of an Air Scout or Sea Scout group also wearing this uniform style.

The uniform is a departure from the uniform worn before 2001 which did not have as wide a range of options and instead focused on a grey, long sleeved sweatshirt and neckerchief which could be either in the group's colours or turquoise in colour. The transition to a blue jumper was well supported by members when consulted in 2000 and many of the suggestions were adopted, with only the proposed activity skirts, canvas belt and ski hat finding disfavour and not being adopted.

Flags
In common with other sections of the movement, Beaver Scouts have a flag for use to identify the section, in parades or when a member is being invested. Uniquely, it is smaller than the other sections so that the flag and pole can be carried by a Beaver Scout, with the flag measuring 2 by 3 feet. The pole is similarly lightweight, usually made of aluminium and with a wooden pike mount. The flag is turquoise with white lettering, a white scout emblem on a purple circular background in the centre of the flag and the scout motto 'Be Prepared' underneath.

Logo and visual identity
When the section was relaunched in 2002, the Beaver Scout logo consisted of the uppercase red word 'Beavers' with a thick yellow outline laid on top of a circular motif that resembled a cross section of a tree, showing the bark and tree rings in different shades of brown. The typeface used for the logo and for headings in Beaver Scout publications was House Industries' Funhouse with Frutiger used for body text in line with the rest of the association. A smaller logo version, where just the letter 'B' was placed atop the log outline, was available as a variant. The brand was updated in 2012 so that text and pictures focused on fun, friendship and adventure of Beavers although the logo did not change and the colours used only changed in a minor way. This emphasis on adventure, and in particular how trying something new is an everyday adventure for a young Beaver Scout, tied in to the association brand focusing on everyday adventure introduced in 2008. The look also introduced a mascot for the section replacing the generic beaver figure in use previously and creating instead a set of four anthropomorphised Beaver characters from different cultures and named after trees (Ash, Chery, Woody and Holly).

In 2015, the Scout Association updated their visual identity style, including the section brands, to focus on the Scouting fleur-de-lis. As part of this, the new Beaver Scout logo was simplified to a turquoise wordmark with a small fleur-de-lis either located to the top right of the wordmark or a larger version located directly above the wordmark. The logo was either available in one colour, turquoise, or in a brighter version with a yellow outline and different coloured letters chosen from the wider association colour palette. The wordmark retained the Funhouse typeface of the previous look; however, this was not used in any other publication; instead TheSerif was used for headings in line with the rest of the association and Frutiger continued to be used for body text. Beaver Scout publications moved away from pictures and outlines and instead featured a character-led artwork style that the association intended as "joyous and imaginative". As part of this illustration style, the mascots were replaced with five represented by anthropomorphised animals: Bobbi (Beaver) their leader and four Beaver Scouts Harry (hippo), Erin (emu), Kyla (kangaroo) and Tareq (turtle).

When the Scout Association brand was updated in May 2018, with a new and stylised fleur-de-lis, the Beaver Scout logo was altered to remove the previous fleur-de-lis mark. The logo colours were also updated with the blue logo becoming darker and the multi-coloured one having its colours changed to reflect the updated corporate colour palette. Publications either continued the use of the previous artwork or used the new image style of the association and the typeface for all documents was updated to use the Google Fonts typeface Nunito Sans.

Events
Being a younger section in Scouting there are comparatively fewer national events for Beaver Scouts; however, events for the section run at district or county level are common with these mostly being open to the young people in that region. Scout campsites and activity centres may also run their own events although advertising of this is not accomplished through national Scout Association channels.

Fundays
Fundays is a national event for Beaver Scouts, Cub Scouts, Rainbows and Brownies and run by Scout Adventures. It is run annually at Gilwell Park and since 2015 has also been run at Woodhouse Park Scout Adventures in June.

The event is designed as a 'turn up and try' activity day so that Beaver Scouts and their leaders and are able to move around the site trying the activities on site without the need to pre-select or choose activities. A range of activities are offered including adventurous activities such as climbing and high ropes, creative endeavours and themed activities such as magic shows, circus acts or jousting.

Damboree
Established in 2018, Damboree is a grass-roots movement to encourage Beaver Scout Leaders to apply for a camp site permit to enable Beaver Scouts to camp. The name is a combination of 'Dam', named for the dams built by beavers, and 'jamboree' which refers to any large gathering of Scouts especially at a national level. Prior to 2015, Beaver Scouts were prohibited from camping but knowledge of the change had not spread sufficiently through the movement, meaning many leaders and local organisations were not camping with Beaver Scouts; the movement led by Andy Sissons the UK Camping advisor was to combat this misconception.

It is part of the Scout Association, being a Scout Active Support unit of Milton Keynes Scouts, but is not directly controlled by Scouts HQ. While the event is not one specific event, there is a focus weekend planned each year which colonies are encouraged to host their camps on.

See also

 The Scout Association - the parent organisation of Beaver Scouts
 Cub Scouts (The Scout Association) - the section that follows Beaver Scouts
 Age Groups in Scouting and Guiding
 Beavers (Scouting) - other similarly aged sections in the UK and around the world
 Joey Scouts - equivalent age group in Australian Scouting
 Rainbows (Girl Guides) - equivalent section in Girlguiding

References

External links
 Official Beaver Scout website

The Scout Association
Early childhood education in the United Kingdom